Originally produced by Minolta, and currently produced by Sony, the AF 75-300mm F4.5-5.6, is a telephoto zoom photographic lens compatible with cameras using the Minolta AF and Sony α lens mounts.

First generation
The first generation body is made of metal. There is a focus limiter switch to speed up focusing.  The lens and the Minolta AF 70-210mm f/4 lens are colloquially known as the "big beercan" and "beercan" by Minolta camera users because their lens shape and size closely match the proportions of a typical aluminum beer can.

Second to third generation
The optical construction is changed. The metal body is replaced by a plastic body. Consequently, the lens is much lighter. The second generation has a focus hold button. Starting from the third generation, this lens is produced in black or silver color.

Fourth generation
The new (D) type supports ADI (Advanced Distance Integration) flash metering function.

Fifth generation
After Sony purchased the Minolta Camera Division, this lens was re-released under the Sony brand. The Sony lens retains most of the Minolta design but comes with a new look.

See also
 List of Minolta A-mount lenses
 List of Sony A-mount lenses

Sources
Dyxum lens data

External links
Sony: 75-300mm F4.5-5.6 zoom lens

75-300
Camera lenses introduced in 2006